The 1909 Campeonato Paulista, organized by the LPF (Liga Paulista de Football), was the 8th season of São Paulo's top association football league. AA das Palmeiras won the title for the 1st time. No teams were relegated and the top scorer was Paulistano's Bibi with 9 goals.

System
The championship was disputed in a double-round robin system, with the team with the most points winning the title.

Championship

With the return of AA das Palmeiras to the league, the bottom two teams of the previous year's championship had to dispute a playoff to define who would remain in the league, won by São Paulo Athletic. 

In the last match, Internacional, that needed to beat Americano to win the title, tied by 1-1 (which would force them into a three-way tiebreak with AA das Palmeiras and Paulistano), with two goals annulled, and at the match's end, the referee was threatened by the Internacional players. Two of Internacional's players were suspended, and after the club's officialdom tried to appeal, the club was expelled from the league for refusing to obey the decision.

Selective tournament

|}

Championship

Finals

References

Campeonato Paulista seasons
Paulista